The Tour du Gévaudan Languedoc-Roussillon is a multi-day road cycling race that has been held annually in France since 2010. It was part of UCI Europe Tour in category 2.1 until 2019 when it was replaced with a women's and men's junior race, and was moved from September to April.

Winners

References

External links

Cycle races in France
1973 establishments in France
Recurring sporting events established in 1973
UCI Europe Tour races